Muhammad Nur Iskandar (born 7 December 1986, in Jayapura) is an Indonesian professional footballer who plays as a winger or attacking midfielder for Liga 2 club Sriwijaya.

International career 
Nur Iskandar receives his first senior international cap against North Korea on September 10, 2012.

Indonesian's goal tally first.

Honours

Club
Persibo Bojonegoro 
Piala Indonesia: 2012
Semen Padang
Indonesian Community Shield: 2013
Sriwijaya
East Kalimantan Governor Cup: 2018

Individual
 Indonesia Soccer Championship A Top Assists: 2016

References

External links
 Nur Iskandar at Soccerway
 Nur Iskandar at Liga Indonesia

Indonesian footballers
1986 births
Living people
People from Jayapura
Indonesian Premier League players
Persitara Jakarta Utara players
Persibo Bojonegoro players
Semen Padang F.C. players
Sriwijaya F.C. players
Bhayangkara F.C. players
Association football forwards
Association football wingers
Sportspeople from Papua